Whitehall is a historic house in Lincoln, Nebraska. It was built in 1910 for Olive White, with "a foundation and trim of light Bedford stone and a large frontal porch of reinforced concrete." White's late husband, C. C. White, had served as a trustee of Nebraska Wesleyan University, a private Methodist university in Lincoln, and she hosted many university events in the house. The house was designed in the Classical Revival architectural style. It has been listed on the National Register of Historic Places since October 29, 1982. 

The house was bought by the state of Nebraska in 1927 to serve as a home for children, and in 1981 it was owned by the Department of Public Welfare of the state.  New housing for children is located on the property (not included in this nomination), and the house is used as offices.

References

National Register of Historic Places in Lancaster County, Nebraska
Neoclassical architecture in Nebraska
Houses completed in 1910
1910 establishments in Nebraska